This is a timeline of Yemeni history, comprising important legal and territorial changes and political events in Yemen and its predecessor states.  To understand the context to these events, see History of Yemen.  See also the List of rulers of Saba and Himyar, the list of Imams of Yemen and the list of presidents of Yemen.

24th century BC

23rd century BC

22nd century BC

21st century BC 

 Centuries: 20th BC19th BC18th BC17th BC16th BC15th BC14th BC13th BC12th BC11th BC10th BC9th BC8th BC7th BC6th BC5th BC4th BC3rd BC2nd BC1st BC

20th century BC

19th century BC

18th century BC

17th century BC

16th century BC

15th century BC

14th century BC

13th century BC

12th century BC

11th century BC

10th century BC

9th century BC

8th century BC

7th century BC

6th century BC

5th century BC

4th century BC

3rd century BC

2nd century BC

1st century BC 

 Centuries: 1st2nd3rd4th5th6th7th8th - 9th - 10th - 11th - 12th - 13th - 14th - 15th - 16th - 17th - 18th - 19th - 20th

1st century AD

2nd century

3rd century

4th century

5th century

6th century

7th century

8th century

9th century

10th century

11th century

12th century

13th century

14th century

15th century

16th century

17th century

18th century

19th century

20th century

21st century

See also 
 Timeline of Aden
 Timeline of Sana'a

Notes

References 
 Andrey Korotayev. Social History of Yemen. Moscow: URSS, 2006. 
 Original text from U.S. State Dept. Country Study
 (1): DAUM, W. (ed.): Yemen. 3000 years of art and civilisation in Arabia Felix., Innsbruck / Frankfurt am Main / Amsterdam [1988]. pp. 53–4.
  History of Yemen
 History of Qahtan
   Timeline of Art History of Arabia including Yemen (The Metropolitan Museum of Art). 
 A Dam at Marib
 Das Fenster zum Jemen (German)
 Geschichte des Jemen (German)
 History of Yemen

Sources

External links
 
 

 

Years in Yemen